Sergei Vladimirovich Dobrin (born 22 September 1986) is a Russian former competitive figure skater. He is the 2005 World Junior bronze medalist and a two-time ISU Junior Grand Prix Final silver medalist. On the senior level, he won bronze medals at the 2006 Trophée Éric Bompard, 2006 Finlandia Trophy, and two Russian Championships (2006 and 2007).

Personal life 
Dobrin was born on 22 September 1986 in Lipetsk and has a sister, Maria, who is 18 years younger. He learned ballroom dancing from age 7 to 10.

Career 
Dobrin started skating in 1991 and trained in Lipetsk until the age of 11. He then relocated to Moscow at the invitation of Zhanna Gromova. She would coach him until 2007.

Dobrin debuted on the ISU Junior Grand Prix (JGP) series in September 2000. After winning silver medals in Ukraine and the Czech Republic, he qualified for the JGP Final in Ayr, Scotland, where he also took silver. After winning the Russian junior title, he was sent to the 2001 World Junior Championships in Sofia, Bulgaria. He placed 5th in his qualifying group, 20th in the short program, 12th in the free skate, and 12th overall.

During the 2002–03 JPG season, Dobrin was awarded gold at both of his assignments – Chemnitz, Germany and Milan, Italy – and silver at the JGP Final in The Hague, Netherlands. He won silver at the Russian Junior Championships and gold at the 2003 European Youth Olympic Festival in Bled, Slovenia. He finished 5th at the 2003 World Junior Championships in Ostrava, Czech Republic, after ranking fourth in his qualifying group, second in the short, and sixth in the free.

In early March 2005, Dobrin won the bronze medal at the World Junior Championships in Kitchener, Ontario, Canada. His senior international debut came later that month, at the 2005 World Championships in Moscow; he placed 5th in his qualifying group, 15th in the short, 15th in the free, and 17th overall.

Dobrin received his first Grand Prix assignments in the 2005–06 season. After placing 7th at the 2005 Trophée Éric Bompard and 10th at the 2005 Cup of Russia, he won his first senior national medal, bronze, at the 2006 Russian Championships. Ranked 14th in the short and 17th in the free, he finished 15th at the 2006 European Championships in Lyon, France.

Dobrin began the 2006–07 season with a bronze medal at the 2006 Finlandia Trophy. Competing in the Grand Prix series, he won bronze at the 2006 Trophée Éric Bompard and placed 8th at the 2006 Cup of Russia. He was awarded bronze at the 2007 Russian Championships and placed 18th at the 2007 European Championships in Warsaw after ranking 15th in the short and 19th in the free.

In August 2007, Dobrin relocated to Saint Petersburg to train under Alexei Mishin. He placed 5th at the 2007 NHK Trophy. He withdrew from the 2008 Russian Championships and finished 13th at the 2009 Russian Championships. In 2009, he left Mishin and joined Victoria Volchkova in Moscow. After placing 12th at the 2010 Russian Championships, Dobrin retired from competition. He worked as a coach in Prokopyevsk, Kemerovo Oblast from 2011 to 2014 and then relocated to Krasnodar.

Programs

Competitive highlights 
GP: Grand Prix; JGP: Junior Grand Prix

References

External links

Russian male single skaters
Living people
1986 births
World Junior Figure Skating Championships medalists
Sportspeople from Lipetsk